Elandskraal is a town in Sekhukhune District Municipality in the Limpopo province of South Africa.

References

Elandskraal which is known by the name Sevenstad was started by seven families who come from Kwandebele in 1986 during Mbhokoo.

Populated places in the Ephraim Mogale Local Municipality